East Village High School (EVHS) is a public San Diego Unified high school located on the campus of San Diego City College in downtown San Diego, California enrolling grades 9 to 12. It was previously named San Diego Early/Middle College until 2016.

Description 
This nontraditional high school offers free college enrollment to its students in the 11th and 12th grade. While earning their high school diploma, a student attending EVHS can earn up to a years worth of college credit.

In 2014, East Village High School was named one of the top high schools in the United States in its 2014 list of best public high schools, ranking 338th among California high schools, and 1,511th nationally. EVHS achieved a Silver Medal Award based on its academic achievement.

References

External links
San Diego Early/Middle College Overview – U.S. News & World Report

Educational institutions in the United States with year of establishment missing
High schools in San Diego
Public high schools in California